GlowCode is a performance and memory/resource profiler developed by Electric Software Inc.

Overview 
GlowCode is used by software developers to analyze and optimize application performance, speed and resource use. GlowCode capabilities include detection of performance bottlenecks and memory leaks.

While the profiled application runs, GlowCode shows the duration, frequency and use of function calls, and identifies which functions play the most significant role in time-intensive tasks, which execution nodes are the source of multiple memory leaks, and which allocations are the source of excessive consumption of memory and resources. GlowCode also identifies problems specific to managed code, including boxing errors, and hyperactive and loitering objects.

GlowCode profiles:
 64-bit and 32-bit code
 Managed, native and mixed code
 Code written in C, C++, C# or any .NET Framework-compliant language.

GlowCode innovation has been underway for nearly two decades.

See also 
Software optimization
List of performance analysis tools

References

External links 
 

Profilers